A nyckelharpa ("keyed fiddle", or literally "key harp", plural ) is the national musical instrument of Sweden. It is a string instrument or chordophone. Its keys are attached to tangents which, when a key is depressed, serve as frets to change the pitch of the string.

The nyckelharpa is similar in appearance to a fiddle or the big Sorb geige or viol. Structurally, it is more closely related to the hurdy-gurdy, both employing key-actuated tangents to change the pitch.

History
 

The Swedish province of Uppland has been a stronghold for nyckelharpa music since the early 17th century, including musicians like Byss-Calle (Carl Ersson Bössa, 1783–1847) from Älvkarleby.

Changes by August Bohlin (1877–1949) in 1929/1930 made the nyckelharpa a chromatic instrument with a straight bow, making it a more violin-like and no longer a bourdon instrument. Composer, player and maker of nyckelharpor Eric Sahlström (1912–1986) used this new instrument and helped to re-popularize it in the mid-20th century. In spite of this, the nyckelharpa's popularity declined until the 1960s roots revival.

The 1960s and 1970s saw a resurgence in the popularity of the nyckelharpa, with notable artists such as Marco Ambrosini (Italy and Germany), Sture Sahlström, Gille, Peter Puma Hedlund and Nils Nordström including the nyckelharpa in both early music and contemporary music offerings.  Continued refinement of the instrument also contributed to the increase in popularity, with instrument builders like Jean-Claude Condi and Annette Osann bringing innovation to the bow and body.

In 1990s, the nyckelharpa was recognised as one of the instruments available for study at the folk music department of the Royal College of Music in Stockholm (Kungliga Musikhögskolan). It has also been a prominent part of several revival groups in the later part of the century, including the trio Väsen, the more contemporary group Hedningarna, the Finnish folk music group Hyperborea and the Swedish folk music groups Dråm and Nordman. It has also been used in non-Scandinavian musical contexts, for example by the Spanish player Ana Alcaide, the English singer and multi-instrumentalist Anna Tam, and Sandra Schmitt of Storm Seeker, a Pirate Metal band from Germany.

The first World Nyckelharpa Day took place on the 26th April 2020 just as the world had gone into lockdown. All the events took place online, either as livestreams or pre-recorded videos in Youtube. This now is a yearly event taking place on the Sunday closest to the 26th April - this being the birthday of the great nyckelharpa player Byss-Calle. The event is co-ordinated by British/Swedish nyckelharpa player Vicki Swan.

Technique

The nyckelharpa is usually played with a strap around the neck, stabilised by the right arm. Didier François, a violinist and nyckelharpist from Belgium, is noted for using an unusual playing posture, holding the nyckelharpa vertically in front of the chest. This allows a wider range of motion for both arms. It also affects the tone and sound of the instrument. Some players may use a violin bracket to keep the nyckelharpa away from the body so that it can swing freely, causing it to sound more "open" as its resonance is not damped.

Variants
There are four common variants of the nyckelharpa still played today, differing in the number and arrangement of keys, number and arrangement of strings, and general body shape. The predominant type is the three-row so-called "chromatic nyckelharpa", with the melody strings tuned A1 - C1 - G, a drone C (from the highest to the lowest string) that is only touched occasionally, and 12 resonance strings (one for each step of the chromatic scale).

The other three variants are:

 Kontrabasharpa - most popular during the 17th and 18th centuries. Typically the top has a high arch, and there are two oval-shaped soundholes in the lower bout called oxögon. The name "Kontrabasharpa" refers not to the pitch being any deeper than a standard nyckelharpa's (it isn't), but to the unstopped drone string which always resonates below the melody strings during regular play. The two melody strings are set up on either side of the drone string, such that melodies can be played as double stops between a single melody string and the open drone string without the two melody strings ever clashing.
 Silverbasharpa - most popular in the 19th and early 20th centuries, so named because of the bass strings which are traditionally wound with silver. It is the immediate predecessor to the modern nyckelharpa, and the string configuration is identical, however it retains the older top with a more pronounced arch as well as the two oxögon. The main difference is that only the top two strings are stopped, meaning that the bottom C and G strings cannot play any other notes, and so nearly all of its repertoire is in the key of C. In addition, some silverbasharpor may be diatonic and not chromatic, and some keys may stop both melody strings at once.
 Oktavharpa - invented by Lennart and Johan Hedin in 1996. It is essentially a modern three-row nyckelharpa tuned an octave down, almost identical to a cello. It is the lowest-pitched variant of the nyckelharpa.

The resonance strings, or sympathetic strings, which were added to the instrument during the 2nd half of the 16th century, are not bowed directly but resonate with the other strings. There can be anywhere from six to twelve of them, depending on the construction and tonality of the instrument.

Some modern nyckelharpas have been made with four or even five rows of keys, however they have not been popular enough to replace the three-row nyckelharpa as the standard.

Gallery

Contemporary applications 
English composer Natalie Holt used nyckelharpa for background score of the Disney+ series Loki.

See also
Hardanger fiddle
Hurdy-gurdy
Music of Sweden
Moraharpa

References

External links

 
 
 
 
 Nyckelharpa Workshops and Teaching in the UK
 

Bowed box zithers
Nordic folk music
String instruments with sympathetic strings
Swedish musical instruments
Swedish folk music
Necked box lutes